Govindraj Nagar Assembly constituency is one of the 224 constituencies in the Karnataka Legislative Assembly of Karnataka a south state of India. It is also part of Bangalore South Lok Sabha constituency.

Members of Legislative Assembly
 2008: V. Somanna, Indian National Congress

 2009 (By-Poll): Priya Krishna, Indian National Congress

 2013: Priya Krishna, Indian National Congress

 2018: V. Somanna, Bharatiya Janata Party

See also
 Bangalore Urban district
 List of constituencies of Karnataka Legislative Assembly

References

Assembly constituencies of Karnataka
Bangalore Urban district